William Gros (born 31 March 1992) is a professional footballer who plays as a striker for AS Vitré and the Madagascar national team.

Club career
Gros played in France for Le Havre and in his native Réunion for JS Saint-Pierroise before signing for Scottish club Kilmarnock in September 2010. After making a substitute appearance, he scored on his first start for the club in March 2011 against St Mirren. Gros signed a new three-year contract with the club in August 2013. In March 2014, following a lack of games, Gros announced he was considering his future at the club.

In June 2014 Gros went on trial with English club Oldham Athletic. On 21 July 2014, Gros signed a one-month contract with the club. Oldham manager Lee Johnson told Gros to prove his fitness in order to earn a longer contract with the club. Gros was released by the club on 21 August 2014.

He then returned to France, playing with Toulouse Rodéo and AS Vitré.

International career
Gros has distant Malagasy ancestry, a great-great-grandmother, a generation that usually exceeds those allowed by the FIFA eligibility rules (parents and grandparents). However, he was called up to the Madagascar national team on 11 August 2018. He made his professional debut for Madagascar in a 1–0 2019 Africa Cup of Nations qualification win over Equatorial Guinea on 16 October 2018.

Personal life
Gros was born to a Martiniquais father and a Réunionnais mother of Malagasy descent. He is the cousin of the footballers Vincent and Mathieu Acapandié.

Career statistics

References

1992 births
Living people
Footballers from Réunion
People with acquired Malagasy citizenship
Malagasy footballers
Madagascar international footballers
Malagasy people of Martiniquais descent
Malagasy people of Réunionnais descent
French footballers
French people of Martiniquais descent
French sportspeople of Malagasy descent
People of Martiniquais descent from Réunion
People of Malagasy descent from Réunion
Association football forwards
2019 Africa Cup of Nations players
Scottish Premier League players
Scottish Professional Football League players
English Football League players
Le Havre AC players
JS Saint-Pierroise players
Kilmarnock F.C. players
Oldham Athletic A.F.C. players
Toulouse Rodéo FC players
AS Vitré players
French expatriate footballers
French expatriate sportspeople in Scotland
Malagasy expatriate sportspeople in Scotland
Expatriate footballers in Scotland
French expatriate sportspeople in England
Malagasy expatriate sportspeople in England
Expatriate footballers in England